Heavy was Swollen Members' fourth full-length release on Battleaxe Records. Many regard it as their most mainstream-sounding release to date, and a strong negative reaction to direction the album took from the group's core fan base resulted in them discontinuing shipments of the album after its initial release. Guest appearances include Abstract Rude and Son Doobie, and album artwork was drawn by Spawn creator Todd McFarlane, who had directed one of their music videos. The song "All Night" was featured on the video game, SSX 3.

Track listing

References

2003 albums
Swollen Members albums